Oleksandr Savanchuk (born 9 October 1982 in Horlivka, in the Donetsk Oblast in the Ukrainian SSR of the Soviet Union) is a Ukrainian football striker.

Savanchuk graduated from FC Shakhtar Horlivka and UOR Donetsk. His first trainer was A. Maltsev.

He is married with Maryna.

Since 2015 plays in the Russian occupied part of Ukraine.

References

External links 
Profile at Official Site FFU (Ukr)

1982 births
Living people
People from Horlivka
Ukrainian footballers
FC Stal Alchevsk players
FC Stal-2 Alchevsk players
FC Krymteplytsia Molodizhne players
FC Naftovyk-Ukrnafta Okhtyrka players
FC Tavria-Skif Rozdol players
Association football forwards
Sportspeople from Donetsk Oblast